Borys Albertovych Filatov (born 7 March 1972, in Dnipropetrovsk) is a Ukrainian politician, journalist, lawyer, businessman, and the current Mayor of Dnipro. In 2014 and 2015 he was a member of the Verkhovna Rada, the Ukrainian parliament.

Biography
On 4 March 2014, he was appointed Deputy Chairman of Dnipropetrovsk Regional State Administration on internal affairs.

In the 2014 Ukrainian parliamentary election Filatov as an independent candidate won a single-member districts located in Dnipropetrovsk with  56.66% of the votes and became thus a member of the Ukrainian parliament (on 27 November 2014). In parliament he joined the inter-fractional group Ukrop.

In the 2015 Ukrainian local elections Filatov was elected Mayor of Dnipropetrovsk (on 15 November 2015) as a UKROP representative. On 24 November 2015 Filatov resigned as member of parliament.

In June 2020 Filatov was one of the founders and joined the new party Proposition.

Filatov was reelected Mayor of Dnipro in the 2020 Ukrainian local elections, this time as a member of Proposition.

Controversies
In September 2014, Filatov threatened in public journalist Anatoly Shariy, using obscene words and promising to beat the journalist.

On 7 April 2020, Oleksandr Dubinsky shared a screenshot (supposedly fake) on his Facebook page in which, on behalf of Filatov, it was promised to shoot pets that residents walk in parks during quarantine. Later on, Dubinsky placed another statement saying that Filatov removed his initial post about pets from his page and affronted the mayor. In comments section under the Dubinsky’s post with insults, Filatov threatened Dubinsky using foul language with mutilations to be inflicted once they meet and literally said that Benia’s (presumably local oligarch Ihor Kolomoyskyi’s) security staff won’t save him. Moreover, Filatov published a post himself where he called (likely) Dubinsky a "Bearded Nana’s (a local nickname for Kolomoyskyi) sidekick".

Notes

References

External links 

 

Living people
1972 births
Politicians from Dnipro
Oles Honchar Dnipro National University alumni
20th-century Ukrainian lawyers
Ukrainian journalists
Ukrainian television journalists
Eighth convocation members of the Verkhovna Rada
Mayors of Dnipro
UKROP politicians
Proposition (party) politicians
Ukrainian people of Russian descent